Hasumi (written: ,  or ) is a Japanese surname. Notable people with the surname include:

, Japanese film director
, Japanese middle-distance runner
, Japanese film critic
, Japanese footballer

Hasumi is also a feminine Japanese given name. Notable people with the name include:

, Japanese curler

See also
Hasumi, Shimane, a former village in Shimane Prefecture, Japan

Japanese feminine given names
Japanese-language surnames